Trinchesia akibai is a species of sea slug, an aeolid nudibranch, a marine gastropod mollusc in the family Trinchesiidae.

Distribution
This species was described from Sagami Bay, Japan.

Description 
The typical adult size of this species is 8 mm.

References 

Trinchesiidae
Gastropods described in 1984